= Medly Pharmacy =

Digital pharmacy retailer

- Industry: Retail
- Founded: 2017
- Defunct: 2023
- Fate: Bankruptcy, acquired by Walgreens
- Headquarters: Bushwick, Brooklyn, New York, United States
- Number of locations: 11
- Products: Pharmaceuticals, drugs

Medly Pharmacy was an American digital pharmacy retail company founded in 2017 by Marg Patel.

== History ==
On December 16, 2020, Medly opened its three-story headquarters in Bushwick, Brooklyn, New York.

Throughout most of 2022, Medly was losing money, resulting in its laying off more than half of its staff members and closing most of its retail stores. Former employees stated that Medly's decline and collapse was because the company grew too quickly.

On December 9, 2022, Medly filed for Chapter 11 bankruptcy protection.

On February 9, 2023, Medly announced it would sell all remaining assets to Walgreens, and would shut down all remaining stores and operations after six years. The company converted its Chapter 11 case to a Chapter 7 bankruptcy liquidation on April 26, 2023.

On September 12, 2024, Medly Health Inc’s. co-founder and former CEO Marg Patel, former CFO Robert Horowitz, and former Head of Rx Operations Chintankumar Bhatt were charged by U.S. Securities and Exchange Commission for defrauding investors in connection with capital raising efforts that netted the company over $170 million.
